Keir Lamont Gist (born September 15, 1969), professionally known by his stage name KayGee, is an American DJ and record producer from East Orange, New Jersey, best known as a member of hip hop trio Naughty by Nature. He has won a Grammy Award for Best Rap Album at the 38th Annual Grammy Awards for Poverty's Paradise. 

In the mid-'90s, Gist created his own R&B-oriented record label, Illtown, which was evolved and developed into Divine Mill, where he discovered and signed acts such as Zhané, Next, Jaheim, Tha' Rayne and Koffee Brown.

Discography

Studio albums

Independent Leaders (1989)
Naughty by Nature (1991)
19 Naughty III (1993)
Poverty's Paradise (1995)
Nineteen Naughty Nine: Nature's Fury (1999)
Anthem Inc. (2011)

Selected production discography

Awards and nominations

!
|-
|rowspan="2"| 1995
|Poverty's Paradise
|Grammy Award for Best Rap Album
|
|rowspan="4"| 
|-
|"Feel Me Flow"
|rowspan="3"| Grammy Award for Best Rap Performance by a Duo or Group
|
|-
|align=center|1993
|"Hip Hop Hooray"
|
|-
|align=center|1991
|"O.P.P."
|
|-

References

External links

1969 births
Living people
Naughty by Nature
American hip hop DJs
American hip hop musicians
Record producers from New Jersey
Grammy Award winners for rap music
Musicians from East Orange, New Jersey